Matinul Haq Usama (7 May 1967 – 18 July 2020) was an Indian Muslim scholar and jurist who served as the Qazi of Kanpur city and state president of Jamiat Ulema-e-Hind for Uttar Pradesh.

Biography
He was born in Fatehpur on 7 May 1967. Usama was an alumnus of Darul Uloom Deoband. He died on 18 July 2020 due to COVID-19.

References

1967 births
2020 deaths
Darul Uloom Deoband alumni
Hanafis
Deobandis